is a Japanese animator, storyboard artist, and director from Kagoshima Prefecture. He is a professor in the department of design at Sapporo City University in Hokkaido, Japan.

Anime involved in
A3!: Series Director
Aishiteruze Baby: Episode Director (ep 19)
BECK: Mongolian Chop Squad: Key Animation (ep 10)
Cautious Hero: The Hero Is Overpowered but Overly Cautious: Director
Celestial Method: Director
Code:Breaker: Storyboard (eps 4, 9, 11), Episode Director (eps 1, 4, 9, 12), Assistant Director
Comic Party: In-Between Animation (eps 3, 7, 12)
Fullmetal Alchemist: Brotherhood: Storyboard (ep 7)
Hand Maid May: In-Between Animation (ep 4)
Heroman: Episode Director (eps 5, 8)
Hit o Nerae!: Unit Director (eps 1, 5)
I My Me! Strawberry Eggs: Key Animation (ep 3)
Kamen no Maid Guy: Director, Storyboard (eps 1, 12)
Kurau: Phantom Memory: Technical director (ep 16)
Matoi the Sacred Slayer: Director
Needless: Director, Storyboard (ep 1, 6, 10, 21, 24), Episode Director (ep 24)
Noragami: Storyboard (ep 8)
Neppu Kairiku Bushi Road: Director
Piano: The Melody of a Young Girl's Heart: Key Animation (ep 5)
Princess Resurrection: Director
Rizelmine: Key Animation (ep 6, 21, 23, 24)
Saint Beast ~Ikusen no Hiru to Yoru Hen ~: Director, Storyboard
Sono Hanabira ni Kuchizuke wo: Anata to Koibito Tsunagi: Director, Storyboard, Episode Director
Spice and Wolf: Episode Director (ep 4), Unit Director (OP)
Strawberry Panic!: Director, Storyboard (ep 1, 4, 26), Episode Director (ep 26)
Sword Art Online Alternative Gun Gale Online: Director
The Marginal Service: Director
The Story of Saiunkoku: Episode Director (ep 35)
Wolverine: Storyboard (ED; eps 2, 10), Episode Director (ED; eps 2, 8)

References

External links
 
 

1974 births
People from Kagoshima Prefecture
Living people
Anime directors
Japanese animators
Japanese animated film directors